Robert Anthony "Tony" Fell (27 December 1931, Liverpool6 December 2011) was a British businessman and musician.

Fell worked for various firms, including ICI in the 1950s, becoming managing director of Hortors Printers from 196874, and managing director of Boosey & Hawkes Music Publishers 197496.

He founded the Johannesburg Bach Choir, which he conducted 196474. He was Chair of the Royal Philharmonic Society 19972005: the Society awarded him an Honorary Membership, which it rarely bestows, in 2011.

References

External links
 Tony Fell profile at Debrett's website

1932 births
2011 deaths
Honorary Members of the Royal Philharmonic Society
Place of death missing
Music publishers (people)
British businesspeople
Chairpersons of the Royal Philharmonic Society